Auma is a town and a former municipality in the district of Greiz, in Thuringia, Germany. Since 1 December 2011, it is part of the municipality Auma-Weidatal. It is situated 24 km southwest of Gera.

History
Within the German Empire (1871-1918), Auma was part of the Grand Duchy of Saxe-Weimar-Eisenach.

References

External links
District Greiz

Towns in Thuringia